Grisha "G." Callen (born: Grisha Aleksandrovich Nikolaev) is a fictional character in the show NCIS: Los Angeles portrayed by Chris O'Donnell. He is an NCIS Special Agent in Charge, and the senior agent assigned to the Office of Special Projects. He first appeared in the NCIS season six episode "Legend (Part I)".

Background 
Before working at NCIS, Callen previously worked for the CIA, DEA, and FBI.  Several episodes across the seasons reference his stint with the Agency. In seasons one and two, it is revealed that while with the CIA, Callen worked alongside recurring NCIS character Trent Kort (David Dayan Fisher), and was partnered with Tracy Rosetti (Marisol Nichols). As part of their undercover mission in Uzbekistan, Callen and Tracy "married," using the surname Keller. Following this mission, where Callen accused Tracy of placing the success of the operation above both their professional and personal partnerships, the two 'divorced,' with Callen joking that in the settlement, Tracy received custody of Buddy, their dog. The marriage and subsequent divorce were fake. In season one, Callen is revealed to have worked with the DEA (on a joint operation with the CIA, where he first met Arkady Kolchek) and the FBI.

Callen once served with his friend Leroy Jethro Gibbs, who now works at the NCIS Headquarters located in the Washington Navy Yard. Callen specializes in deep undercover work.  Prior to the series commencing, G. Callen and Sam Hanna had been partnered for two years (as per the season three episode "Partner" where they celebrate their five-year partnership).

G. Callen grew up in foster care, never knowing who his parents were or even his first name.  In the show's first episode "Identity", it is revealed that he is called "G" not because he dislikes his first name, but because he does not actually know what it stands for, as the system never told him. Further insights into his childhood come in season one's "Pushback", where Hetty Lange and operational psychologist Dr. Nate Getz discuss how Callen lived in thirty-seven foster homes from the age of five to the age of eighteen, sometimes moving every few days.  The longest he ever stayed in one place was for three months at fourteen, when he lived with the family of a Russian girl named Alina Rostoff (whom he called "little sister"). A flashback in the finale of season one forces Callen to recall he had an older sister who unfortunately died by drowning in a river. She was buried with the name of Hannah Lawson, while the real Hannah lived with the assumed name of her dead foster friend, Amy Callen. It has not yet been revealed why the two siblings were split up and sent to opposite sides of America, although it can be assumed this was on instruction of their father, in order to keep them safe from the Comescu family.

Callen's childhood was fraught with abuse, which is referenced during various episodes.  He readily identifies with characters who share a similar upbringing, understanding why kids join gangs or the military and knows exactly where runaway teens gather in LA. In season one ("Keeping It Real") he recalls that he once watched his foster father beat his foster brother to death. In season four, he shares how moving unexpectedly to a new home that wasn't quite so nice, made him close off his feelings. Callen also reassured a teenager that if you sleep well on the first night, it's a good home (season four, "Purity").  In "Reznikov, N." (season five), Callen tells Kensi and Deeks that when he was ten, his foster father used to beat him with a broom handle. He was moved after a few weeks not because he was abused, but because he decided to smack his foster father over the head with the same weapon. During the season six episode "Rage," an undercover operation in prison sees him encounter a youth whose situation causes him to recall his troubled teenage years. Callen ran away from his last foster family, was arrested for robbing a storage locker and sent to a juvenile detention center, which he described as hell. After three weeks he escaped, stole a car, crashed it and was re-arrested, only to be rescued on the street from the police by Hetty.

Over the course of the seasons, Callen has discovered more about his identity and flashbacks in the season two finale prompted him to suddenly recall that he spent part of his early childhood on the Romanian coast of the Black Sea. He also uncovers repressed memories of witnessing his mother being assassinated in front of him when he was four. Early in season three, Hetty finally tells Callen that she knew his mother, Clara and she was her CIA handler. Callen's maternal line back to his grandfather George Callen is revealed, as well as the Romanian blood feud between the Callens and the Comescus. George Callen was OSS (which later became the CIA) and hunted Romanian war criminals after WWII and killed Comescus. He then married a Romanian girl, they had a daughter and returned to the US. A number of years later, Clara Callen undertook a CIA mission in Romania, unfortunately allowing the Comescus to exact their revenge on George Callen's daughter.

"Reznikov, N.", the show's 100th episode, was a landmark in Callen's journey of self-discovery. Until then the identity of his father was unknown but the Comescus track down and kidnap a man named Michael Reinhardt, painting a message in blood on the wall of Reinhardt's house, that they have his father.  At gunpoint, Reinhardt tells Callen his name is Nikita Reznikov and with his dying breath says to tell him he kept his promise (to keep track of Callen – and presumably his sister). An archive search found Nikita Aleksandr Reznikov was a Russian Major in the KGB, who was arrested in 1974 and sent to the Gulag for helping families escape to the West.

While his friends address him as "G", Hetty refuses to do so, saying, "It's not a name, it's a letter." She instead addresses him as "Mr. Callen" ("Identity"). Once he discovers his full name, Hetty still calls him "Mr. Callen" rather than Grisha. The rest of the team continue to refer to him as Callen, as does his sister. Only his father calls him Grisha.

In addition to English, Callen is fluent in at least six other languages: Spanish, Polish, Russian, German (which is claimed to be Austrian, and is usually completely butchered), Italian (with a Northern accent), and French. Callen also claims to speak Czech and Romanian; furthermore, his Russian is arguably good enough to be taken for one, but not the other, Chechen dialect. That fluency allowed Callen to infiltrate a Chechen terrorist cell in the season four episode "The Chosen One" which eerily presaged the Boston Marathon bombing by Chechen immigrants less than three months later. The fake death certificate shown by Hetty to Alexa Comescu in the season-two finale states that his date of birth is March 11, 1970. In the Season 1 episode "Search and Destroy" (S1:E4), Callen is shown easily reading Arabic, with enough fluency to translate on the fly into idiomatic English.

In "Archangel", Callen states that the first time he fired a gun was at the age of 20. In the same episode, it was revealed that Hetty has beaten him on a race up the NCIS rock wall three times in a row, and Callen refuses to challenge her to a re-match despite goading from Sam Hanna.

As an adult, his foster-sister Rostoff was secretly sent to watch Callen and to prevent him from being killed by Russian mobsters. Callen is fluent in Russian due to his former relationship with the Rostoff family. Throughout the first season, it is shown that Callen is homeless, staying temporarily with his various NCIS colleagues and sometimes in the Operations Center itself.

Storylines

NCIS season 6 
At the end of "Legend", Callen was almost killed in a drive-by shooting. Callen and the team later realized (in the first-season episode "Pushback") that his shooting was related to a mission Callen took part in against the Russian Mob, as a DEA agent ten years earlier.

Season 1 
In the first-season finale "Callen, G.", Callen tracks down a woman named Amy Taylor (née Callen) who initially claims to be his older sister, but then admits her real name is actually Hannah Lawson, and that she was friends with the real Amy Callen when they lived in an orphanage together. The real Amy had died at the age of 11 when the two friends sneaked out at night to play in the nearby river, and Amy had been swept away in an accident. When Hannah returned, she slept in Amy's bed, and the authorities there never realized what had happened. When Amy's body was found a month later, she was buried under Hannah's name as the authorities didn't know any better. Callen later goes to visit his sister's grave, and finds flowers and a recent note left "For my Sweet daughter always in my Heart". Also during the episode, Nate Getz  discovers that a list of all of Callen's foster homes and orphanages was written by one person, albeit over a number of years, indicating that someone had been keeping an eye on Callen during that time. The same list showed the various orphanages and foster homes where the real and fake Amy, including the last foster home where Amy (aka Hannah) stayed for many years, indicating this person did not know about the switch between Hannah and Amy. In season 3 "Deadline", Callen discovers that Hetty had kept an eye on him during his youth (confirmed in season 6 "Rage"), and also knew his sister died. But in season 5's "Reznikov, N." it is revealed that Hans Schreiber also kept track of Callen's life, as a favor to Callen's father. It has not been confirmed who actually wrote the list of foster homes and orphanages however it is assumed that he wrote the list as Nate Getz analysed the list as having been written with an aging hand, as and when the changes of homes took place.

Season 2 
In the season two premiere "Human Traffic", Hetty makes arrangements for Callen to purchase a house of his own—the very same house where he lived with Alina Rostoff as a foster child.

The second season mostly revolves around Callen, who has been stalked by someone he does not know. He sees someone near the grave of his sister, and over the course of the season, runs into people who seem to know more about his past than he does. When Hetty resigns and takes off to Prague, Callen finds out from Director Vance that Hetty has started her own investigation, Operation Comescu, which is all about Callen. Callen and the team then resign too when Vance refuses to fly them to Prague to get Hetty. Arriving in Prague, the team discovers that Hetty has been taken by the Comescus and that the Comescus have been in a decades-long blood feud with the Callens, of which G is the last one. The team tracks their safe house down to a house on the beach, and Callen starts to remember things from his past, as he realizes he has been on this beach before. Inside the house, Hetty fails to convince Alexa Comescu, the matriarch of the Comescu family, that Callen died three weeks ago, showing her a clip of the attempted assassination and a death certificate.

Season 3 
In the third-season premiere, "Lange, H.", it is revealed that Callen's grandfather was an OSS agent stationed in Romania. In the third-season episode number 4 "Deadline", Hetty Lange reveals to Callen that his grandfather was named George Callen and that he parachuted into Romania during the War, and at the end took part in hunting those guilty of war crimes, he subsequently found and killed several members of the Comescu family. In 1947 he met and married a 'Romanian Girl' (Callen's grandmother, name unknown). George Callen was murdered by the Comescu family. The remainder of Callen's family (his grandmother and her daughter, Callen's mother, Clara) fled to America where years later Clara was recruited by the CIA. She returned to Romania and then a year later vanished for six years. The Comescu family had not forgotten their grudge and came looking for the Callens. One of Callen's most vivid memories of his childhood is of being given a toy soldier by a stranger while he played on the beach. He realizes that the beach is not in California as he had always assumed, but on the Black Sea coast, and that the toy was given to him to distract him while a Comescu assassin killed his mother. It is never explained why the Comescu family let Callen and his sister live, though Alexa Comescu describes it as "a mistake". Callen confronts Alexa, both holding guns on each other, and Alexa claims to know everything about him.  Her words persuade him to lower his weapon providing Alexa the opportunity she needs to kill the last Callen.  Before she can pull the trigger, Hunter shoots her dead.

Back in LA, Hunter is the acting Operations Manager until Hetty returns to work after sustaining a gunshot during Operation Comescu. Callen does not trust Hunter and wants to know more about himself and what was on the laptop that she retrieved at the Comescu house. Hunter later tells him that all the contents of the laptop were concerning the family's illegal activities and not about Callen. Hetty later returns when Hunter leaves for another undercover operation in Europe and offers to tell Callen everything starting with the reason she was trying to protect him: she had failed to protect his mother. She then gives him his mother's name: Clara. She also tells him that his mother was a CIA agent and that Hetty had been her handler when Clara had gone back on assignment to Romania. After a year of the mission, Clara vanished for six years and resurfaced with two children, desperate to get out of Romania. Hetty had been sent to meet her on the beach where the Comescus killed her. She also says that she doesn't know how he and his sister came to the U.S. and that she had no idea who his father is but that she was the one responsible for getting him out of the orphanage and into foster homes.

In the third-season finale, "Sans Voir", Agent Mike Renko and former Operations Manager Lauren Hunter are both murdered at the hands of Marcel Janvier, also known as "The Chameleon". Callen appears to gun down Janvier following a prisoner exchange. The episode ends with Callen being arrested by LAPD and Hetty resigning her position at OSP.

Season 4 
A series of flashbacks in the season four opening episode "Endgame" reveal that Janvier's death was faked. After Janvier and Callen are traded back to their respective sides in a prisoner exchange, Callen—following his fake suspension—returns to lead the OSP team once again. Janvier returns again at the end of season 4.

Season 5 
In the season 5 opener, Janvier reminds Callen that he will be seeking his revenge, even if he has to wait many years to exact it, quoting the Count of Monte Cristo by Alexandre Dumas.

In the season five episode "Reznikov, N.", a man named Michael Reinhardt appears. Reinhardt claims that his true name is Nikita Alexsandr Reznikov and that he is Callen's father. He is kidnapped and killed by one of the surviving members of the Comescu family, Vasile. At the end of the episode, Hetty and Arkady Kolcheck explain to Callen that the real Reznikov was a KGB major who was arrested and sent to a Soviet gulag in 1974, around the time Callen and his sister came to America. Reinhardt (actually named Hans Schreiber) was a former East German who owed Reznikov a favor and repaid it by keeping track of Callen and his sister. The Comescus mistook him for Reznikov, who kept up the ruse to protect Callen. In Reinhardt's house, Deeks discovered an 8 mm film of Callen and Amy playing with Reznikov. Hetty gave it to Callen.

In "War Cries", Sam, Michelle, and Hetty set Callen up on a blind date with Joelle Taylor, a friend of the Hannas and their daughter's former kindergarten teacher. Both aware of the trick, they nevertheless get on well although Callen immediately makes up a fake career to protect his role. Throughout season five, Joelle is mentioned as Callen's girlfriend.

Season 6 
In "Humbug", an armed robber threatens Joelle in public after stealing some malware from a defense contractor. When it is learned that the robber placed the stolen malware on Joelle, Callen is forced to put himself in danger to protect her, eventually being forced to reveal to her that he is an NCIS agent. Although she appears hurt by this revelation of Callen's deception, she eventually accepts to continue their relationship as long as he tells her more about himself. Callen and Joelle are confirmed to be still together by both Sam and Callen himself. Callen later tells the team he would not be against starting a family with Joelle.

Callen realizes Arkady Kolchek knows more about his father than he's revealed. When a mission to find a ship with stolen barrels of oil leads to Russia, Arkady accompanies the team. While there, Arkady takes Callen to a coffee shop and shows him a photo of Callen's father (Reznikov) from the 1980s, long after he was supposedly sent to the Gulag. Through Eric's hacking, Hetty discovers that Reznikov took the name of Chernoff. Callen realises he was working in Moscow at the same time his father frequented the city.

Season 7 
In season seven, Callen admits that he and Joelle are fighting a lot. They break up off screen but still spend Christmas together to avoid being lonely. In "Matryoshka, Part 2", Callen meets Reznikov in Russia. He reveals that Callen's birth name is Grisha Aleksandrovich Nikolaev, but has to leave before he could find out any more information. Callen has since updated his personnel records and credentials with his full name.

Season 8 
Callen reunites with Reznikov in "Glasnost", where he shoots a man who went after a woman victim he was visiting and reveals he had been in touch with Arkady Kolcheck since the Russia incident back in Season Seven. Callen interrogates his father, who admits he's in LA for work—not to see his son. After Hetty takes over the interrogation, she allows Reznikov to escape to finish what he started. Callen and Sam go to his rescue, and Callen discovers that Reznikov helped a woman move to the U.S. and fathered a child with her. That child has since become a parent, so Callen has a half-sister and is now an uncle. In the episode "Payback", Callen learns from Hetty that Joelle is an undercover CIA agent who has been assigned by rogue agency moles to spy on him. Feeling betrayed, Callen permanently severs his ties with Joelle.

References 

Fictional characters from Los Angeles
Television characters introduced in 2009
Fictional Central Intelligence Agency personnel
Fictional Drug Enforcement Administration personnel
Fictional immigrants to the United States
Fictional Naval Criminal Investigative Service personnel
Fictional Romanian people
Fictional secret agents and spies
NCIS (TV series) characters
NCIS: Los Angeles characters
Crossover characters in television